Javanmard (also Romanized as Javānmard) is a village in Behi Dehbokri Rural District of Simmineh District of Bukan County, West Azerbaijan province, Iran. At the 2006 National Census, its population was 787 in 153 households. The following census in 2011 counted 677 people in 166 households. The latest census in 2016 showed a population of 646 people in 204 households; it was the largest village in its rural district.

References 

Bukan County

Populated places in West Azerbaijan Province

Populated places in Bukan County